Manitowoc County Airport  is located two miles northwest of Manitowoc, in Manitowoc County, Wisconsin. It is 21 miles from Whistling Straights golf course and 34 minutes from Road America.

The Federal Aviation Administration (FAA) National Plan of Integrated Airport Systems for 2021–2025 categorized it as a local general aviation facility.

The first airline flights were North Central DC-3s in 1953–1954; successor Republic pulled out in 1981–1983.

Facilities
The airport covers 710 acres (287 ha) at an elevation of 651 feet (198 m). It has two asphalt runways: 17/35 is 5,001 by 100 feet (1,524 x 30 m) and 7/25 is 3,341 by 100 feet (1,018 x 30 m).

For the year ending September 14, 2021 the airport had 33,100 aircraft operations, an average of 91 per day: 97% general aviation, 3% air taxi and less than 1% military. In January 2023, there were 60 aircraft based at this airport: 55 single-engine, 2 multi-engine, 1 jet and 2 glider.

The Manitowoc (MTW) DME is on the field; the VOR function of this navaid was decommissioned sometime in mid-2019.

Lakeshore Aviation was the fixed-base operator (FBO) until December 1, 2013, when Manitowoc County took over operations.

See also
 List of airports in Wisconsin

References

External links 
 Manitowoc County (MTW) at Wisconsin DOT
 

Airports in Wisconsin
Buildings and structures in Manitowoc County, Wisconsin